The Société de transport de Montréal (STM) is a public transport agency that operates transit bus and rapid transit services in the urban agglomeration of Montreal, Quebec, Canada. Established in 1861 as the "Montreal City Passenger Railway Company", it has grown to comprise four subway lines with a total of 68 stations, as well as 212 bus routes and 23 night routes. The STM was created in 2002 to replace the Société de transport de la communauté urbaine de Montréal (STCUM). The STM operates the most heavily used urban mass transit system in Canada, and one of the most heavily used rapid transit systems in North America. As of 2019, the average daily ridership is 2,297,600 passengers: 977,400 by bus, 1,306,500 by rapid transit and 13,700 by paratransit service.

History

Several other public transport companies existed prior to the creation of the STM. From 1861 to 1886, the Montreal City Passenger Railway Company operated a small network of horse-drawn trams (also called streetcars in North America).

In 1886, the company changed its name to the Montreal Street Railway Company. The first electric tram appeared in 1892 and was nicknamed "the Rocket". The company underwent another name change in 1893: MSTR became the MTR for Montreal Island Beltline Railway. A year later, the network was fully electrified and in 1894, the last horse-drawn tram was taken out of service. From 1910 to 1911, the company was named Montreal Public Service Corporation before changing again to Montreal Tramways Company.

Although they were put into service in 1919, buses only began to be widely used starting in 1925, with the creation of several regular lines. Then in 1937, the first trolley buses were used. In 1939, the company had 929 trams, 224 buses and 7 trolley buses, serving about 200 million passengers per year. The replacement of tram lines by buses began in 1951, when a law was passed by the provincial government that transferred the overall management of transport in Montreal to a public organization, the Commission de transport de Montréal (CTM). The last tram was withdrawn from service in 1959.

The Montreal Metro was inaugurated in 1966 and the same year saw the end of trolley bus service.

The CTM became the Commission de transport de la communauté urbaine de Montréal (CTCUM) in January 1970, and in 1985, rebranded itself again, becoming the Société de Transport de la Communauté Urbaine de Montréal (STCUM). Commuter trains ceased to be the managed by the STCUM in 1996 and responsibility for this service was transferred to the newly created Agence métropolitaine de transport.

It was not until 2002, at the time of the merger of Montreal with other municipalities on the Island of Montreal, that the Société de transport de Montreal was created, taking the place of the STCUM.

Streetcars

From 1861 to 1959, Montreal had an extensive streetcar system. The streetcar network had its beginnings with the horsecar era of the Montreal City Passenger Railway in 1861. That private company would become the Montreal Street Railway in 1886 and the Montreal Tramways Company in 1911. The assets of the company were taken over by the city-owned Montreal Transportation Commission in 1951.

Regional transit service

The STM was formerly involved in the operation of regional transit services. The first such service was a set of bus routes inherited from the October 1980 expropriation of a private bus company called Metropolitan Provincial (1967) Inc. These regional bus routes operated from downtown Montreal to the western part of the Island of Montreal, as well as to off-island points located west, southwest, and northeast of the Island of Montreal. By the end of 1985, the STM (then known by the initials CTCUM) had exited the regional bus business to focus on its core territory (the Island of Montreal). Most of the regional bus routes were passed to private operators who provided services under contract to newly formed intermunicipal transit councils.

The second regional service involved the management of two commuter train lines. On July 1, 1982, the CTCUM and the Canadian National Railway (CN) entered into an agreement to integrate the Montreal-Deux Montagnes commuter train line into the regular CTCUM bus and Metro network. The CTCUM paid CN to staff, run, and maintain the trains, while it set the fares and schedules. Passengers travelling within the CTCUM operating territory were able to transfer between the trains and the bus or Metro, no fare supplement was required to make a bus/Metro to train transfer . On October 1, 1982, a similar agreement with the Canadian Pacific Railway (CP) went into effect, and CP's Montreal-Rigaud commuter train line was integrated into the CTCUM network.

On January 1, 1996, responsibility for the commuter trains was transferred to the Agence métropolitaine de transport (AMT) (now RTM), a Quebec provincial government agency formed to coordinate all public transportation in the metropolitan Montreal region.

Services

Fares
The Société de transport de Montréal (STM) operates Metro and bus services in Montreal and transfers between the two are free inside a 120-minute time frame after the first validation.

As of July 1, 2022, the Autorité régionale de transport métropolitain (ARTM), which is responsible for the distribution of fares in the Greater Montreal area, designated 4 zones within its territory A, B, C and D. The Island of Montreal is within zone A. The city of Laval and the Agglomeration of Longueuil are part of zone B. The northern and southern suburbs of Montreal (off-island) are part of zone C. Zone D territory is not under the authority of the ARTM, but it is still responsible for the distribution of fares there as well. The island of Montreal was placed into zone A and fares for zones B, C and D can be bought separately or together. For example, you can purchase all modes A, all modes AB, all modes ABC or all modes ABCD. There are no all-mode fares for zones B, C, or D. In order to travel to that specific zone, it is necessary to purchase the all modes AB, ABC or ABCD fare even if the destination is zone C. The metro fares are fully integrated with the Exo commuter rail system, which links the Metro to the outer suburbs via six interchange stations (Bonaventure, Lucien-L'Allier, Vendôme, De la Concorde, Sauvé, and Parc) and the under-construction réseau express métropolitain (REM). The fares for Exo, the REM and the Metro for zone A are only valid on the island of Montreal. In order to take the Exo, REM or Metro trains from Montreal to Laval (zone B) or another zone you must have the corresponding fares for that zone.

As of February 2022, the STM no longer accepts cash at Metro stations (cash is only accepted for bus fares); only debit and credit cards can be used to purchase tickets. Children between 6 and 17 years old and seniors aged 65+ have access to reduced ticket prices as well as reduced monthly passes. While students age 18 to 25 years old can only purchase a reduced monthly pass with a photo ID Opus card. When a ticket or cash fare is used, a free transfer can be used for trips in one direction that are completed within two hours. Except for cash, these and other fares are stored on an OPUS card. Children 5 years of age and younger, accompanied by an adult, travel for free. Children under 5 cannot travel unaccompanied.

OPUS

On April 21, 2008, the STM unveiled the contactless smart card called OPUS (a word that phonetically includes the French word puce, which is the generic French word for the chip used in any type smart card ) as a means of fare payment. In preparation for this new step in Montreal's public transportation network, turnstiles which incorporate the reader and automated vending machines had already been installed in Metro stations; buses had previously been fitted with new fare boxes that incorporated the card reader in order to ensure the uniformity of methods of payment across Montreal's transit network and that of its suburbs.

The project was originally supposed to be implemented in 2006. In 2019, the STM announced plans to introduce improved OPUS card readers on buses beginning in 2020 in order to enable all-door boarding and debit card payment.

Schedules and route information

Each stop on each route is assigned a number and some of these systems require a user to know the number.

In 2017 the STM introduced "iBus", a real-time GPS tracking system. It includes electronic signs inside buses showing the estimated time of arrival at upcoming stops and the busiest bus stops have electronic signs showing the estimated time of arrival of the next bus.

All 68 Metro stations are equipped with the MétroVision information screens which displays advertising, news headlines and weather information from RDI and MétéoMédia, as well as STM-specific information regarding service changes, service delays and information pertaining to using the system.

Accessibility

All 197 daytime bus routes and 23 night routes are wheelchair accessible. All Metro lines except the Yellow line are accessible to wheelchairs. As of June 2021, there are 17 stations with elevators installed: Angrignon, Côte-Vertu, Du Collège, Snowdon, Lionel-Groulx, Bonaventure, Place-d'Armes, Champ-de-Mars, Berri-UQAM (orange and green lines only), Rosemont, Jean-Talon, Henri-Bourassa, Cartier, De La Concorde, Montmorency, McGill, Place-Des-Arts, Prefontaine, Honoré-Beaugrand, Jean-Drapeau, Vendôme, Viau, Pie-Xi  . All of the elevators can be reached from street level.

Connections to other transit services

STM is connected to surrounding transit agencies such as:
 Société de transport de Laval (STL) — City of Laval
 Réseau de transport de Longueuil (RTL) — City of Longueuil
 Exo (EXO) — provides commuter rail service to Vaudreuil-Hudson, Deux-Montagnes, Saint-Jérôme, Mont Saint Hilaire, Candiac and Mascouche lines; as well as a number of commuter bus and transit lines which provide service to suburban and rural areas such as Châteauguay, Salaberry-de-Valleyfield, Saint-Jean-sur-Richelieu, Saint-Hyacinthe, Sorel-Tracy, Repentigny, Terrebonne, and Saint-Jérôme.
 Via Rail — provides inter-city/inter-provincial passenger rail services throughout Canada.
 Amtrak — provides passenger rail services throughout United States.

Security and enforcement

Since the start of Metro service in 1966, the STM (and predecessors) has had its own transit enforcement unit. 

Since 2021, the transit officers are sworn as Special Constables. They now be subject to the Police Act and, consequently, the authority of the Commissaire à la déontologie policière (police ethics commissioner). In addition, the Bureau des enquêtes indépendantes (BEI) will be able to take over investigations as needed.

In Quebec, special constables are peace officers. Their mission is to maintain peace, order and public security, to prevent and repress crime and, according to the jurisdiction specified in their deeds of appointment, to enforce the law and municipal by-laws, and to apprehend offenders.

The Service de police de la Ville de Montréal has a Unité métro (Metro Unit) that patrols Metro trains and stations as well. This unit has been in service since 2007.

Incidents

On May 10, 2012, smoke bombs were set off at Lionel-Groulx, Jean-Talon, Préfontaine, Fabre and Pie-IX stations, resulting in evacuations of the affected stations and a complete shutdown of the Metro for over two hours. The incident was not officially linked to the 2012 Quebec student strike.

In 2009, a woman was arrested, handcuffed, and searched by Laval Police Service officers for allegedly not holding an escalator handrail. Her case was rejected by both Quebec Superior Court and the Quebec Court of Appeal. In November 2018, the Supreme Court of Canada agreed to hear her appeal and in November 2019, ruled that her arrest and subsequent search were unlawful and had violated her rights. The court also awarded her $20,000 in damages.

Transit modes

Metro

The Montreal Metro rapid transit system was introduced in 1966 in preparation for the Canadian Centennial and Expo 67 World Fair in Montreal. Instead of traditional steel-wheeled trains, it is a rubber-tired metro, based on technology developed for the Paris Métro; Montreal's system was the first in the world to be entirely rubber-tired (as not all of Paris's lines use tires). The Metro system is Canada's busiest subway system in total daily passenger usage; in 2017, serving an average of 1,235,200 daily passengers on an average weekday; a figure which surpassed that of the Toronto subway and Vancouver SkyTrain. In 2016, 354 million riders (transfers not included) used the Metro.

Bus services

The STM bus service operates well over 200 bus routes serving a number of different markets. These routes serve an average of 1,403,700 daily passengers each weekday.

Local network routes, numbered 10–299, generally operate seven days per week, from 5:00 am to 1:00 am. Some routes offer decreased services on weekends and holidays. Within this classification, some routes operate only at peak hours Monday through Friday, and sometimes only in peak directions. The Navettes Or, numbered above 250, are specifically designed to serve the needs of senior citizens.
All-night network routes, with route numbers from 300 to 399, generally operate from 1:00 am to 5:00 am, seven days per week, at a maximum headway of 45 minutes. Some routes offer increased service early on Saturday and Sunday ("late" on Friday and Saturday).
Express Network routes, numbered 400–499, are limited-stop routes. Some routes are classified as Metrobus, and Trainbus and are geared to deliver commuters to specific Metro and commuter train stations, although these designations are no longer in use. Most Express routes operate only at peak hours Monday through Friday, and sometimes only in peak directions.
Shuttle Network routes, numbered 700–799, are special-purpose routes serving Canadiens hockey games, tourist areas like Old Montreal and La Ronde, as well as the 747 route running 24/7 between downtown and Montréal–Pierre Elliott Trudeau International Airport.

On August 30, 2010, the STM introduced the "10 Minutes Max" network. This network, overlaid on both the local and express networks described above, schedules buses at a maximum headway of 10 minutes, between 6 a.m. and 9 p.m., Monday to Friday, on 31 of the STM's busiest bus routes. A few routes support that maximum headway only in the customary peak direction mornings and afternoons, while some routes outside of the advertised network attain similarly short headways but within shorter periods. However, on January 6, 2023, the STM announced it planned to permanently end all "10 Minutes Max" routes due to budget cuts and constraints caused by the COVID-19 pandemic and a decline in ridership.

In the early 2010s, the STM announced a plan to convert its entire fleet of buses over to electric power by 2025. Beginning in 2012, all STM bus purchases will be either hybrids or electric. STM began to pilot the use of electric buses in 2014. From 2025, STM plans to only order electric buses, after extensive testing confirmed that buses could handle Montréal's cold winters.

Pie-IX BRT 

After an initial attempt in the 1990s, a bus rapid transit (BRT) line will open on Pie-IX Boulevard from 2022. This will use dedicated lanes, have priority at intersections and have all door boarding to increase capacity and improve reliability on the corridor.

Taxibus

The STM also operates ten taxibus lines where the creation of regular bus service is not feasible. Regular STM fares apply, except that no cash is accepted.

 Baie-d'Urfé, connecting to Baie-d'Urfé commuter railway station
 Stewart Hall, connecting to various locations in Pointe-Claire
 Île-des-Soeurs, connecting to Place du Commerce
 Lachine, connecting to Lachine commuter railway station
 L'Île-Bizard, connecting to bus route 407 Express Île-Bizard
 Norman, connecting Lachine's residential neighborhoods to the industrial area north of Highway 20
 Lachine Industrial Park, connecting to Dorval commuter railway station
 Phillips Avenue (Senneville), connecting to bus route 419 Express John Abbott
 Sainte-Anne-de-Bellevue, Sainte-Marie district, connecting to Sainte-Anne-de-Bellevue commuter railway station
 Senneville, connecting to Sainte-Anne-de-Bellevue commuter railway station
 Montreal Technoparc, connecting to Sunnybrooke commuter railway station

Paratransit Service

The Société de Transport de Montréal operates a paratransit service for people with mobility problems. The lack of subway accessibility is critical for people whose mobility needs cannot be accommodated by stairs. STM's adapted transit is a system based on reservation, meaning that there is no room for flexibility. All trips must be booked at least one day in advance.
Service began in April 1980. In first quarter, 2011, 9,200 trips were made through this service daily.

Current vehicles
The STM operates over 2,000 buses in its fleet. In recent years, only one model model has been used – the Nova Bus LF Series. , the bus fleet comprises around 1,000 40 ft diesel buses, around 650 40 ft hybrid buses, and around 250 62 ft articulated buses.

Infrastructure

Terminal

Most STM bus routes terminate at loops, side streets or Metro stations.

Regional Terminals

 Terminus Angrignon
 Terminus Côte-Vertu
 Terminus Dorval
 Terminus Fairview
 Terminus Henri-Bourassa Nord
 Terminus Henri-Bourassa Sud
 Terminus Honoré-Beaugrand
 Terminus Radisson

Other smaller STM loops/terminals include

 Terminus Anjou
 Terminus Atwater
 Terminus Jolicoeur
 Terminus Lafleur-Newman
 Terminus MacDonald
 Terminus Sherbrooke/Gouin
 Terminus Vendôme
 Terminus 100th Avenue
 Beaubien Loop
 Crémazie Loop
 Laurier Loop
 Rosemont Loop
 Villa Maria Loop
 Du College Loop

Facilities
STM buses are operated out of a number of garages located around the city. They are Anjou, Frontenac, LaSalle, Legendre, Mont-Royal, Stinson, St-Denis, St-Laurent and St-Michel for Paratransit. The surface routes are divided into several divisions. Individual divisions have a superintendent, an on-duty mobile supervisor, a communications centre, and a garage facility tasked with managing the division's vehicle fleet and routes.

Metro trains are stored in the four garages at Angrignon, Beaugrand, Montmorency and Saint-Charles and there are three maintenance facilities at Duvernay, Plateau d'Youville and Viau.

Stops and shelters

There are 8,500 bus stops in the STM network. Each stop has a panel that indicates the number of routes that stops there, the type of service, if the bus goes to a Metro or train station and the bus stop code enabling one to obtain the schedule by telephone at 514-AUTO-BUS. The STM is in the process of changing all its bus stop panels to a new modern pole that displays the route numbers. The route number is color-coded for the type of service it offers, dark blue is for regular routes, green is for express, metrobus and R-bus routes, black for night routes and gold for senior shuttles. Advertising is provided by CBS. On November 8, 2010, the STM launched 3 prototypes of modern bus shelters to replace the old ones. They will run on a solar power system and lights in the shelter are to be controlled by motion sensor. Bus shelters at high-traffic intersections feature an interactive screen where people can use hand gestures to access weather, news and bus route information. Since the introduction of GPS in the fleet, the screen can also be used to track busses on the route.

See also

 Montreal Expo Express

References

External links
 Société de transport de Montréal (STM) (English)
 Route maps and schedules
 History of Buses in Montreal
 Choice of Maps
 Montreal by Metro

 
Exo (public transit)
Montreal
Montreal
Intermodal transport authorities in Canada
Montreal Metro
Crown corporations of Quebec
Underground rapid transit in Canada
Transport companies established in 2002
2002 establishments in Quebec